Jacotin (French diminutive of Jacques) may refer to:

 Jacob Godebrye (?–1529), active in the Antwerp Cathedral from 1479 to 1529
 Jacques (or Giacomo) Level, singer who served the papal chapel in Rome between 1516 and 1521
 Jacotin Le Bel (?–1555), singer and canon in the French royal chapel from 1532 to 1555 believed to be the same person as Jacques Level
 Jacquet of Mantua (1483–1559), French composer who spent almost his entire life in Italy
 Jacquet de Berchem (c.1505–1567), Franco-Flemish composer active in Italy
 Jacques Arcadelt (c.1507–1568), Franco-Flemish composer active in both Italy and France
 Giaches de Wert (1535–1596), Franco-Flemish composer active in Italy
 Pierre Jacotin (1765–1827), French map-maker for Napoleon